McLemore Avenue is a 1970 album by Booker T. & the M.G.s, consisting entirely of mostly instrumental covers of songs from the Beatles' album Abbey Road (released only months earlier, in September 1969). The title and cover are an homage to the Beatles album, 926 East McLemore Avenue being the address of the Stax Studios in Memphis, as Abbey Road was for London’s EMI Studios, which were soon renamed Abbey Road Studios. As a nod to Abbey Road's medley, most of the M.G.s' selections are arranged into their own medleys (with the exception of "Something", which was released as a single and reached number 76 in the US).

Booker T. Jones said, "I was in California when I heard Abbey Road, and I thought it was incredibly courageous of The Beatles to drop their format and move out musically like they did. To push the limit like that and reinvent themselves when they had no need to do  that. They were the top band in the world but they still reinvented themselves. The music was just incredible so I felt I needed to pay tribute to it."

Track listing
All songs written by Lennon–McCartney except "Here Comes the Sun" and "Something", by George Harrison

Side one
Medley: "Golden Slumbers", "Carry That Weight", "The End" (with vocals), "Here Comes the Sun", "Come Together" (with incidental vocals)– 15:48
"Something" – 4:09

Side two
Medley: "Because", "You Never Give Me Your Money" – 7:26
Medley: "Sun King", "Mean Mr. Mustard", "Polythene Pam", "She Came In Through the Bathroom Window", "I Want You (She's So Heavy)" – 10:40

2011 Stax Remasters bonus tracks
"You Can't Do That" – 2:47 
"Day Tripper" – 2:52
"Michelle" – 2:52 (Originally released on The Booker T. Set)
"Eleanor Rigby" – 3:41 (Originally released on Soul Limbo)
"Lady Madonna" – 3:35 (Originally released on The Booker T. Set)
"You Can't Do That" (alternate take) – 3:08

It was also released digitally in a lossless and high quality version at 88.2 kHz and 24 bit.

Personnel
Booker T. & the M.G.s
 Booker T. Jones – organ, piano, keyboards, guitar
 Steve Cropper – guitar
 Donald Dunn – bass guitar
 Al Jackson Jr. – drums

Production credits
 Produced and arranged by Booker T. & the M.G.'s
 Engineers – Ron Capone, Gordon Rudd, Rik Pekkonen, Terry Manning
 Remix engineers – Steve Cropper, John Fry
 Photography – Joel Brodsky
 Art direction – The Graffiteria/David Krieger
 Art supervision – Herb Kole

Booker T. & the M.G.'s albums
1970 albums
The Beatles tribute albums
Stax Records albums
Albums with cover art by Joel Brodsky
Albums produced by Al Jackson Jr.
Albums produced by Donald "Duck" Dunn
Albums produced by Steve Cropper
Albums produced by Booker T. Jones
Albums recorded at Wally Heider Studios